Andreea Violeta Marin (born 22 December 1974, in Roman, Neamț County) is a Romanian television presenter and TV personality.

Early life and career
She majored in Journalism, Public Relations & Advertisement, Computer Programming and Mathematics & Physics during her college years. She debuted in 1994 at TVR Iași as emcee.

Her involvement within the Romanian media seems to have directly contributed to her selection as the most successful female media person in the country. On 2 December 2006, Marin hosted the 2006 Junior Eurovision Song Contest. She also presented the Romanian votes at the 2000, 2004, 2006, and 2007 Eurovision Song Contest finals.

Since 1999, she has hosted and directed Surprize, Surprize ("Surprises, Surprises"), a long-running show about life stories involving disabled people, people without money, and people with relatives gone away, broadcast on TVR1.

Marin is the communications director of Madrid-based Prime Time World Broadcast, and the editorial director of the Romanian version of Business Woman Magazine.

Personal life
Married to Ștefan Bănică Jr. in 2006, she was subsequently known as Andreea Marin Bănică. They have a daughter, Ana Violeta Bănică (b. 15 December 2007). The couple divorced in 2013. She married physician Tuncay Öztürk in 2014. In October 2016, they announced the end of their marriage. Their marriage was officially ended on 13 February 2017.

Andreea Marin is the only Romanian UNICEF Goodwill Ambassador.

References

External links

Profile in English
 Personal blog
 Business Woman Romania editorial page
 *Interview in Cariere magazine

1974 births
Living people
People from Roman, Romania
Romanian television presenters
Romanian women television presenters
Masked Singer winners
Romania in the Eurovision Song Contest